The Joshua James Blanchard House (also known as the William A. Blanchard House) is a historic house located at 415 Carrolls Road near Warsaw, Duplin County, North Carolina.

Description and history 
It was built about 1898 in the Greek Revival style, and is a two-story, hipped-roof structure with a timber-frame and a one-story gabled-roof kitchen wing. It features a one-story hipped-roof wraparound porch.

It was added to the National Register of Historic Places on August 28, 2012.

References

Houses on the National Register of Historic Places in North Carolina
Houses completed in 1898
Houses in Duplin County, North Carolina
National Register of Historic Places in Duplin County, North Carolina
Greek Revival houses in North Carolina